Psacalium is a genus of flowering plants in the sunflower family. Indianbush is a common name for Psacalium.

 Species

References

Senecioneae
Asteraceae genera
Flora of North America